(), Lufthansa CityLine, a subsidiary of Lufthansa and part of the Lufthansa Regional brand, serves the following destinations:

List

References

Lufthansa CityLine
Lufthansa
Lufthansa CityLine